The discography of Spanish house DJ Juan Magán consists of three studio albums, a compilation album, three EPs and some singles.

Studio albums

Compilation albums

Record labels collaborations
 2009: Magan & Rodriguez: Suave

EPs
 2003: Logical Progression
 2008: Juan Magan & Cesar del Rio: Midnite Rumors
 2009: Juan & Victor Magan: A Family Affaire

Singles
as Magan & Rodriguez

Solo and collaborative

Collaborations and remixes
 Ni Rosas Ni Juguetes (Remix) (with Paulina Rubio and Pitbull)
 Algo De Ti (Remix) (with Paulina Rubio)
 Oh Baby (with Dero and Robbie Rivera)
 Se Me Va La Voz (Remix) (with Alejandro Fernandez)
 Sun Is Up (Remix) (with Inna)
 Lady Loca (with Crossfire)
 Hotel Nacional (Remix) (with Gloria Estefan)
 Odio Por Amor (Remix) (with Juanes)
 Get High (Remix) (with Ruby)
 Un Momento (with Inna)
 Rabiosa (Remix) (with Shakira)
 Inevitable (Remix) (with Dulce Maria)
 Yerbatero (Remix) (with Juanes)
 Pegate Mas (Remix) (with Dyland and Lenny)
 Give You Up (with Soraya Arnelas)
 Now Or Never (Remix) (with Emilia De Poret)
 Me Rio De Ti (Remix) (with Gloria Trevi)
 Enamorada De Ti (Merengue Remix) (with Selena)
 No Me Digas Que No (Remix) (with Enrique Iglesias and Wisin & Yandel)
 Kingsize Heart (with Javi Mula)
 Some Love 2.0 (with Marsal Ventura, Surrender DJs and Medussa)
 Amarte Bien (with Carlos Baute)
 El Cielo No Entiende (Remix) (with OBK)
 Ella No Sigue Modas (with Don Omar)
 Join The Party (In My Boat) (with Leticia)
 Be My Lover (Remix) (with Inna)
 Sólo Contigo (with Topic and Lena)
 Claro Que Si (with Mohombi, Yasiris and Hyenas)
 Esa Carita (with María Isabel)

References

Discographies of Spanish artists
House music discographies
Electronic music discographies